Three vessels of the British Royal Navy have been named HMS Lysander, after Lysander, a military commander of ancient Sparta.

 The first Lysander was a 4-gun brig, listed from 1842 to 1844 but with little further information available.
 The second  was a  destroyer launched in 1913 as Ulysses but renamed a few weeks later, and sold in 1922.
 The third  was an  launched in 1943 as HMCS Hespeler, renamed Cornflower in 1956, and broken up 1957.

Royal Navy ship names